Last Feelings is a 1978 melodrama film written and directed by  Ruggero Deodato.

Plot 
Diego Micheli is a troubled teenage runaway who tries to turn his life around by joining a swimming team and competing in national tryouts and champion races. After coming to the attention of Marco, a swimming instructor, and falling in love with Marco's sister Claudia, he is diagnosed with a terminal brain tumor, and is determined to take part in the European Swimming Championships in Holland before it can kill him.

Cast 
 Carlo Lupo as Diego Micheli
 Vittoria Galeazzi as Claudia
 Fiorenzo Fiorentini as Anselmo
 Jacques Sernas as The Sports Director 
 Angela Goodwin as Maria Micheli, Diego's Mother 
 Luigi Diberti as Marco, swimming instructor
 Emilio Delle Piane as The Sports Doctor 
 Gino Pagnani as Giovanni
 Deddi Savagnone as The School Teacher
  Gianni Solaro as The Hospital Doctor 
 Roberto Pangaro as himself

References

External links

Italian drama films
1978 drama films
1978 films
Films directed by Ruggero Deodato
Swimming films
1970s Italian films